Gunhed may refer to:

 Gunhed (film), the 1989 Japanese film
 Gunhed is a fictional giant robot, whose name is an acronym that stands for "Gun Unit Heavy Elimination Device".

 Media adaptations of Gunhed
 The manga adaptation of the film by Kia Asamiya
 Gunhed (video game), a shooting game developed by Compile in 1989 for the PC Engine (known as Blazing Lazers in the West)
 Gunhed: The New Battle, released for the Famicom (Nintendo Entertainment System) in 1990